The Olympic Committee of Bosnia and Herzegovina (Bosnian, Croatian and Serbian Latin: Olimpijski komitet Bosne i Hercegovine; Serbian Cyrillic: Олимпијски комитет Босне и Херцеговине) is the non-profit organization representing Bosnia and Herzegovina athletes in the International Olympic Committee. The committee organizes Bosnia's representatives at the Summer and Winter Olympic Games.

Members of the committee are 38 sports federations, which elect the Executive Council composed of the president and twelve members.

History
The Olympic Committee of Bosnia and Herzegovina was founded on June 4, 1992. It grew out of the ZOI '84 organization, organizers of the 1984 Winter Olympics in Sarajevo. The committee maintains the Museum of the XIV Winter Olympiad. The first president of the committee was Stjepan Kljuić, with Izudin Filipović being the first secretary general. It became a full IOC and European Olympic Committee member in 1993.

Shortly after its foundation, the committee drafted the first athletes to participate under the Bosnian flag in the Olympic games for the 1992 Summer Olympics in Barcelona.

List of presidents

Executive committee
President: Milanko Mučibabić
Vice Presidents: Marijan Kvesić i Izet Rađo
 Members: Elvedin Begić, Nihad Selimović, Mirsad Ćatić, Slobodan Grahovac, Edin Krupalija, Ivan Brkić, Kornelija Leko, Goran Bošnjak, Branislav Crnogorac, Nada Kujundžić

Member federations
National Federations of Bosnia and Herzegovina are the organizations that coordinate all aspects of their individual sports. They are responsible for training, competition and development of their sports. There are currently 24 Olympic Summer and 6 Winter Sport Federations and eight Non-Olympic Sports Federations in Bosnia and Herzegovina.

Olympic Sport federations

Non-Olympic Sport federations

See also
 Bosnia and Herzegovina at the Olympics

External links
Official website

Bosnia and Herzegovina
Bosnia and Herzegovina at the Olympics
1992 establishments in Bosnia and Herzegovina
Sports governing bodies in Bosnia and Herzegovina
Sports organizations established in 1992